The Office of Mine Safety and Health Research (OMSHR) is a division within the United States' National Institute for Occupational Safety and Health (NIOSH) devoted towards the elimination of mining fatalities, injuries, and illnesses through research and prevention. As a part of NIOSH, OMSHR is grouped under the  Centers for Disease Control and Prevention (CDC), within the Department of Health and Human Services (DHHS). The work done by OMSHR was originally conducted by the United States Bureau of Mines, which was founded in 1910. Following the dissolution of the U.S. Bureau of Mines in 1995-1996, The Safety and Health Program was transferred to the United States Department of Energy on an interim basis. In 1997, OMSHR was created when the responsibilities of mine safety and health research was permanently transferred to NIOSH. 

Research done by OMSHR is primarily focused in two locations: Pittsburgh, Pennsylvania and Spokane, Washington. The OMSHR Pittsburgh site focuses on a larger scope of mine safety and health issues, including dust monitoring and control, mine ventilation, hearing loss prevention and engineering noise controls, diesel particulate monitoring and control, emergency response and rescue, firefighting and prevention, training research, ergonomics and machine safety, mine ground control, electrical safety, explosives safety, surveillance, and technology transfer. The OMSHR Spokane site primarily focuses on metal and nonmetal mining.

See also
Mining
Occupational safety and health
Research center
The National Personal Protective Technology Laboratory

External links
CDC - Office of Mine Safety and Health Research - NIOSH

References

National Institute for Occupational Safety and Health
Mine safety